Adam Rogers (born December 9, 1985) is a former professional Canadian football offensive lineman. He most recently played for the Hamilton Tiger-Cats of the Canadian Football League. He was signed by the Edmonton Eskimos as an undrafted free agent in 2008. He played CIS football for the Acadia Axemen.

External links
Hamilton Tiger-Cats bio

1985 births
Living people
Acadia Axemen football players
Canadian football offensive linemen
Edmonton Elks players
Hamilton Tiger-Cats players
Sportspeople from Kawartha Lakes
Players of Canadian football from Ontario